United Independents (IU) was a Chilean electoral pact that grouped together the United Centre, National Citizen Party and independent parties for the 2021 parliamentary and regional councilor elections.

History 
The coalition was officially registered with the Electoral Service (Servel) on August 19, 2021. One of its leaders is the academic and television panelist Cristián Contreras Radovic, who seeks to run as a presidential candidate for the November 2021 election as a representative of United Centre.

Initially, some media reported the alleged inclusion of National Force, an openly Pinochetist organization that is in formation as a political party, and which is headed by former deputy Hermógenes Pérez de Arce and lawyer Raúl Meza. Later, Contreras himself denied that the group was part of the pact, accusing the media that had spread said inclusion of spreading false information, and demanding its rectification.

IU has an authority in the country, which corresponds to a councilor from the Villarrica commune who is active in the National Citizen Party.

It will seek to present 10 candidates for senators, 85 for deputies and 79 for regional councilors.

Composition 
It is made up of the United Centre and the National Citizen Party, parties registered in various areas of the country. The leaders of the parties that make up the coalition at the time of formation are:

References

External links
Partido Nacional Ciudadano
Centro Unido
Defunct political party alliances in Chile
Far-right politics in Chile
Political parties disestablished in 2022
Political parties established in 2021